(sometimes  or ) are priestesses of the Ryukyuan religion at Utaki. They have existed since at least the beginning of the Gusuku period (late 12th century) and continue to perform rituals even today.

History
The first daughter became the first , and the second daughter became the first village priestess. The god of fire gave a piece of fire from Ryūgū-jō to each  to create a village hearth, from which each family in the village would take fire to maintain their own family hearths. The  maintained the royal hearth. The  were charged with conducting official rituals and ceremonies for their respective village. The  was charged with conducting rituals and ceremonies on behalf of the entire kingdom, and traveled with the king to Sefa-utaki to worship Amamikyu.

Upon taking the throne in 1469, King Shō En made his sister the Chief  of his home of Izena, and his daughter . The  also had a new residence built near Shuri Castle so she could maintain the Sonohyan-utaki.

After the 1609 invasion by Satsuma, Confucian thought entered the Ryukyuan government and began eroding the authority of the priestesses. Shō Shōken, acting as Prime Minister of Ryukyu, convinced the king to stop or scale down a number of religious rituals and ceremonies in the name of saving money and minimizing aspects of Ryukyuan culture that might seem "backwards" to Satsuma, such as the king and 's pilgrimage to Sefa-utaki. However, local village priestesses still retained influence and power until the end of the 19th century.

After Japan annexed the Ryukyu Kingdom in 1879, the Meiji government began attempts at absorbing the Ryukyuan religion into State Shinto. The priestesses and their shrines were co-opted by the government and registered. The  were prohibited from being recognized as part of the Shinto priesthood and, unlike their Shinto counterparts, were not guaranteed protection by the state. Furthermore, the government abolished their salaries. Then-Governor of Okinawa Prefecture Hibi Shigeaki stated that this limitation on the use of  land stipends was "for the maintenance of  lands [...] for their eventual reclassification into [Shinto] shrines." As the influence of  declined, the popularity of  increased.

The  served as the priestess for the Ryukyu Kingdom and the royal family. She conducted national ceremonies, oversaw all other  priestesses, and maintained the royal hearth and the most sacred . The inauguration ceremony, of a new  was held at Seifa-utaki. The ceremony represented the holy marriage between Amamikyu and Shinerikyu. After she was inaugurated, she stayed in the position until her death. The position was abolished along with the kingdom in 1879; however, the last  continued her role until her death in 1944.

duties and responsibilities

 were responsible for maintaining the village hearth and helping to establish new households. They primarily conducted rituals and ceremonies for their respective village at a local . Girls from each family in a village were assigned to be the 's assistant, although men could also be assistants for public ceremonies.  also communicated with and channeled ancestors and deities.

Symbols

 are most recognizable by their white robes and headdress, which symbolize spiritual purity. They also wear or carry beads and a  stone. The 's hearth includes three stones teepee-ed together; the stones always come from the shore.

Hierarchy

References

Religion in the Ryukyu Islands
Ryukyuan culture
Shamanism in Japan
Religious titles
Priestesses